Meeuw is a surname. Notable people with the surname include:

 Folkert Meeuw (born 1946), German swimmer, husband of Jutta and father of Helge
 Helge Meeuw (born 1984), German swimmer
 Jutta Meeuw (born 1954), German swimmer

See also
 Meeuws
 Meeuwis